The 11th Hussar Regiment, initially called the 2nd Westphalian Regiment, was a notable cavalry unit of the Royal Prussian Army and the German Imperial Army.

It was established in Düsseldorf in December 1807 and originally bore the name of 2nd Royal Westphalian Hussar Regiment. It was a continuation of an earlier unit, the Chevau-légers Uhlan Regiment of the Duchy of Berg formed by Joachim Murat earlier during the Napoleonic Wars.

In 1906 the regiment gained the nickname of "Dancing Hussars of Krefeld" after Emperor Wilhelm II personally ordered the regiment to relocate from Düsseldorf to Krebs following that city's aristocracy's complaints that there were not enough bachelors to dance at the balls. Thereupon the Emperor promised to send appropriate dancers. What was at first thought of as a joke, was later the same day confirmed by General Moritz von Bissing, the commanding officer of the 7th Army Corps.

The regiment took part in World War I as part of the 9th Cavalry Division. Initially at the Western Front, in late 1914 it was moved to the Eastern Front where it remained for the rest of the conflict (mostly in the region of Polesie). Dismounted in 1916, the regiment was disbanded along with the rest of the division in early March 1918.

See also
List of Imperial German cavalry regiments

References

Cavalry regiments of the Prussian Army
Hussars